Envision Energy is a Chinese multinational corporation headquartered in Shanghai that provides wind turbines and energy management software.

History 

Envision was founded by Lei Zhang in 2007 in Jiangyin, Jiangsu in the east region of China. Zhang was named Top 10 Chinese innovators in 2014 by China Daily. The company started full operations since 2009.

In 2013, Envision installed five 2.1 MW, 110-metre-rotor turbines at the Ucuquer wind farm in central Chile. It also signed software contracts with US developer Pattern Energy’s fleet and compatriot Atlantic Power’s Canadian Hills wind farm in Oklahoma

In 2014, Envision is partnering with New Zealand's infrastructure fund manager Infratil to build smart infrastructure in Christchurch, New Zealand.

In 2015, Envision launched its office in London to handle business in Europe, the Middle East, and Africa Its entry into the European market was the purchase of a 25MW onshore project near Eskilstuna, Sweden. It also acquired ViveEnergia's 600 MW wind energy projects in Mexico in the same year.

In early 2016, Envision launched a new operational head office in Hamburg, Germany, which provides service to its international clients in European countries, and a Global Blade Innovation Center in Boulder, Colorado, which will lead the R&D of blade design in the US. Envision's Ucuquer wind farm project in Chile has been selected as finalist in Inter-American Development Bank’s 360 2016 Infrastructure Awards. The company also made a new investment in a renewable energy project in Montenegro along with Enemalta, Shanghai Electric Power, and Vestigo. Currently, Envision is in the process of installing 5 more wind turbines in La Esperanza Wind Farm in Negrete Municipality, Chile by the end of March 2016.

In 2018, Nissan Motors has entered into a definitive agreement with Envision for the sale of Nissan's electric battery operations and production facilities to Envision.

Operations 

Envision's R&D operations are based in its headquarter in Shanghai, in a factory complex in Jiangyin, and in an innovation center in Silkeborg, Denmark, staffed by 40 engineers focusing on advanced turbine technology. There is a battery-storage R&D center in Osaka, Japan, a cloud service center in Houston, and a digital innovation center in Silicon Valley, California. The company has installed over 2,400 wind turbines globally. It also provides software that is used in over 6,000 wind turbines in North America, Europe, Latin America and China.

In 2020, Envision is ranked No.4 among top wind turbine suppliers in the world.

References

External links 

  

Chinese brands
Chinese companies established in 2007
Companies based in Shanghai
Engineering companies of China
Privately held companies of China
Renewable energy technology companies
Wind power in China
Wind turbine manufacturers